Ebba Tulu Chala (born 22 June 1996) is a Swedish athlete who competes in the marathon. He was born in Ethiopia and emigrated as a child.

Early life
Chala is an Oromo from near Bekoji, where the altitude is between 2,500 and 3,000 metres. and although he was not a runner, he walked between one and two hours each way to school. After his father was murdered by Tigre and he himself was imprisoned and tortured, his uncle smuggled him out of Ethiopia to Nairobi, from where he reached Sweden as an unaccompanied minor refugee in 2013; he does not know what happened to his mother and siblings. He found his way to refugee accommodation in Salem, near Stockholm, where he stayed for a year.

Running career
Three weeks after his discovery, Chala was entered by his teacher in a 10,000 m race at Nacka, and came third with a time of 32.22. Since 2015, he has won one bronze and four silver medals at the Swedish Athletics Championships, his first for the marathon being silver in 2019.

At the Seville Marathon in February 2020, he reached the international qualifying standard for the Summer Olympics as well as the World Athletics Championships with a personal best time of 2:11:18; however, the Swedish Olympic standard is lower, at 2 hours, 11 minutes. Sidelined by injuries after that, he returned to run the Stockholm Marathon in 2021 and in early 2022 trained in Ethiopia together with the Iranian-Swedish marathoner . He was not selected for the 2021 Olympics.

Initially threatened with deportation, Chala became a naturalised Swedish citizen on 15 May 2022.

References

External links
 

1996 births
Living people
Swedish male marathon runners
Ethiopian male marathon runners
Naturalized citizens of Sweden
Swedish people of Ethiopian descent
Swedish sportspeople of African descent
Sportspeople of Ethiopian descent
People from Oromia Region
Oromo people
Refugees in Sweden